Snoody Creek is a stream in the U.S. state of Mississippi.

Snoody is a name derived from the Choctaw language purported to mean "deer sleep there". A variant name is "Sanooda Creek".

References

Rivers of Mississippi
Rivers of Kemper County, Mississippi
Mississippi placenames of Native American origin